The Robbinsville Industrial Track is a short freight line that runs between Bordentown, New Jersey to the Yardville section of Hamilton Township, New Jersey. The line was originally part of the Camden and Amboy Railroad and later served as part of the Pennsylvania Railroad, Penn Central Transportation and then Conrail. It is currently operated by Conrail Shared Assets Operations (CSAO).

The line is serviced by train WPBU-20, which is based out of Conrail's Burlington Yard in Burlington, New Jersey and travels first on the Bordentown Secondary which is owned and operated by the New Jersey Transit River Line before it gets to line. The line meets with the Bordentown Secondary in Bordentown. New Jersey Transit purchased the Bordentown Secondary from Conrail in 1999. Conrail continues to operate freight trains on the Secondary, but these operations are restricted to overnight hours.

At the beginning of 2010, Conrail was granted $2 million in funds from the NJ Department of Transportation to complete major upgrades to the line.

References

External links 
Photos of the Robbinsville Industrial Track (Circa 1978)
Conrail Shared Assets Train on the Robbinsville Industrial Track, May 2010
Preservation efforts for the line's abandoned right of way

Rail transportation in New Jersey
Transportation in Mercer County, New Jersey
Railway lines opened in 1832